Constantiodes is a monotypic moth genus of the family Noctuidae. Its only species, Constantiodes pyralina, is found in Ethiopia, Kenya, Mauritania, Oman, Saudi Arabia and Somalia. Both the genus and species were first described by George Hampson in 1916.

References

Hadeninae
Monotypic moth genera